Mary Howard, Duchess of Norfolk and 7th Baroness Mordaunt (c.1659–17 November 1705) was a British peer.

Born Lady Mary Mordaunt, she was the only surviving child and heiress of Henry Mordaunt, 2nd Earl of Peterborough and Lady Penelope O'Brien, daughter of Barnabas O'Brien, 6th Earl of Thomond. On 8 August 1677, she married Henry Howard, Earl of Arundel, who later succeeded his father as Duke of Norfolk in 1684. The duke and duchess separated a year later and she succeeded to her father's barony in 1697.

The duke and duchess were divorced in 1700, due to her adulterous relationship with Sir John Germain, 1st Baronet, whom she married a year later; a previous effort by the Duke to divorce her in 1692 had failed. Although he had obtained damages in an action for criminal conversation, in which the details of her affair were revealed in lurid detail, the jury awarded her husband only £66 instead of the £100,000 he had asked for. This no doubt reflects their opinion of the Duke's own conduct: his own counsel remarked that his charges against Germain were an example of "the pot calling the kettle black". She died without children from either marriage in 1705 and her title was inherited by her cousin, Charles, who had previously inherited her father's earldom.

Her memorial is in St Peter's Church, Lowick.

External links

1705 deaths
1650s births
Mary
7
Daughters of British earls
Mordaunt, Mary Howard, 7th Baroness of
Wives of baronets